The 2017 Southeastern Conference football season was the 85th season of SEC football and took place during the 2017 NCAA Division I FBS football season. The season began on August 31 and will end with the 2017 SEC Championship Game on December 2.  The SEC is a Power Five conference under the College Football Playoff format along with the Atlantic Coast Conference, the Big 12 Conference, the Big Ten Conference, and the Pac–12 Conference.  For the 2017 season, the SEC has 14 teams divided into two divisions of seven each, named East and West.

Preseason

Recruiting classes

SEC media days
The SEC conducted its annual media days at the Hyatt Regency Birmingham – The Wynfrey Hotel in Hoover, Alabama between July 11 and July 14. The event commenced with a speech by commissioner Greg Sankey, and all 14 teams sent their head coaches and three selected players to speak with members of the media. The event along with all speakers and interviews were broadcast live on the SEC Network and streamed live on ESPN.com.

Preseason media polls
The SEC Media Days concluded with its annual preseason media polls. Since 1992, the credentialed media has gotten the preseason champion correct just six times. Only nine times has the preseason pick even made it to the SEC title game. Below are the results of the media poll with total points received next to each school and first-place votes in parentheses.

SEC Champion Voting
 Alabama – 217
 Auburn – 11
 Georgia – 6
 Florida – 3
 LSU – 3 
 Texas A&M – 1
 South Carolina – 1
 Arkansas – 1
 Vanderbilt – 1

West Division
 1. Alabama – 1,683 (225)
 2. Auburn – 1,329 (13) 
 3. LSU – 1,262 (4)
 4. Arkansas  – 796 (1)
 5. Texas A&M – 722
 6. Mississippi State – 633
 7. Ole Miss – 379

East Division
 1. Georgia – 1,572 (138)
 2. Florida – 1,526 (96)
 3. Tennessee – 998 (3)
 4. South Carolina – 897 (5)
 5. Kentucky – 869
 6. Vanderbilt  – 554 (1)
 7. Missouri - 388 

References:

Preseason All-SEC Media

References:

Head coaches
Note: All stats shown are before the beginning of the season.

References:

Rankings

Schedule

Regular season

All times Eastern time.  SEC teams in bold.

Rankings reflect those of the AP poll for that week until week 10 when CFP rankings are used.

Week One

Week Two

The game between Florida and Northern Colorado was canceled due to Hurricane Irma. Both schools' athletic directors decided not to reschedule the game as the two teams do not share a common bye week.

Week Three

Week Four

Week Five

Week Six

Week Seven

Week Eight

Week Nine

Week Ten

Week Eleven

Week Twelve

Week Thirteen

Championship game

Week Fourteen (2017 SEC Championship Game)

SEC vs other conferences

SEC vs. Power 5 matchups
This is a list of teams considered by the SEC as "Power Five" teams for purposes of meeting league requirements that each member play at least one "power" team in non-conference play. In addition to the SEC, the NCAA officially considers all football members of the ACC, Big 10, Big 12 and Pac-12, plus independent Notre Dame (a full but non-football ACC member), as "Power Five" teams. Although the NCAA does not consider BYU a "Power Five" school, the SEC considers games against BYU as satisfying its "Power Five" scheduling requirement.

All rankings are from the current AP Poll at the time of the game.

Records against other conferences

Regular Season

Post Season

Postseason

Bowl games

(Rankings from final CFP Poll; All times Eastern)

Awards and honors

Player of the week honors

SEC Individual Awards
The following individuals won the conference's annual player and coach awards:

Offensive Player of the Year: Kerryon Johnson, Auburn
Defensive Player of the Year: Roquan Smith, Georgia
Coach of the Year: Kirby Smart, Georgia
Special Teams Player of the Year: Daniel Carlson, Auburn
Freshman Player of the Year: Jake Fromm, Georgia
Newcomer Player of the Year: Jarrett Stidham, Auburn
Jacobs Blocking Trophy: Braden Smith, Auburn
Scholar-Athlete Player of the Year: Danny Etling, LSU

Reference:

All-Conference teams

Coaches

Media

References:

All-Americans

OL – Braden Smith, Auburn (AP, ESPN, CBS)
OL – Frank Ragnow, Arkansas (CBS)
LB – Jeff Holland, Auburn (SI)
LB – Roquan Smith, Georgia (AP, AFCA, FWAA, WCFF, TSN, SI, USAT, ESPN, CBS, CFN)
LB – Rashaan Evans, Alabama (AFCA)
DB – Carlton Davis, Auburn (SI)
DB – Minkah Fitzpatrick, Alabama (AP, AFCA, FWAA, WCFF, TSN, SI, USAT, ESPN, CBS, CFN)
PK – Daniel Carlson, Auburn (AFCA, WCFF, CBS)
P – Johnny Townsend, Florida (SI)
P – J. K. Scott, Alabama (CFN)

National Award Finalists

Winners in bold
 Manning Award (quarterback) – Jalen Hurts, Alabama; Jarrett Stidham, Auburn
 Bednarik Award (best defensive player) – Minkah Fitzpatrick, Alabama; Roquan Smith, Georgia
 Bronko Nagurski Award (best defensive player) – Minkah Fitzpatrick, Alabama; Roquan Smith, Georgia
 Butkus Award (best linebacker) – Roquan Smith, Georgia
 Jim Thorpe Award (best defensive back) – Minkah Fitzpatrick, Alabama
 Wuerffel Trophy (humanitarian–athlete) – Courtney Love, Kentucky
 Lou Groza Award (best kicker) – Daniel Carlson, Auburn
 Ray Guy Award (best punter) – J. K. Scott, Alabama
 AP Coach of the Year – Kirby Smart, Georgia

Home game attendance

Game played at Arkansas' secondary home stadium War Memorial Stadium, capacity: 54,120.

Reference:

References